The 1990 Holden NSW Open (known as such in 1990 for sponsorship reasons) was a combined men's and women's tennis tournament played on outdoor hard courts. It was the 98th edition (the 22nd edition in the Open Era) of the event known that year as the Holden New South Wales (NSW) Open, and was part of the ATP World Series of the 1990 ATP Tour, and the WTA Tier III tournaments of the 1990 WTA Tour. It took place at the White City Stadium in Sydney, Australia, from 8 to 14 January 1990. Yannick Noah and Natasha Zvereva won the singles titles.

Finals

Men's singles

 Yannick Noah defeated  Carl-Uwe Steeb, 5–7, 6–3, 6–4
It was Noah's first singles title of the year and the 23rd, and last, of his career.

Women's singles
 Natasha Zvereva defeated  Barbara Paulus, 4–6, 6–1, 6–3
It was Zvereva's second singles title of the year, and of her career.

Men's doubles

 Pat Cash /  Mark Kratzmann defeated  Pieter Aldrich /  Danie Visser, 6–4, 7–5
It was Cash's first doubles title of the year, and the 10th of his career.
It was Kratzmann's first doubles title of the year, and the ninth of his career.

Women's doubles
 Jana Novotná /  Helena Suková defeated  Larisa Savchenko /  Natasha Zvereva, 6–3, 7–5
It was Novotná's second doubles title of the year, and the 16th of her career.
It was Suková's second doubles title of the year, and the 33rd of her career.

References
General

Specific

 
1990s in Sydney